"It's My Life" is a song by the English new wave band Talk Talk. Written by Mark Hollis and Tim Friese-Greene, it was the title track on the band's second album and released as its first single in January 1984. It reached number 46 on the UK Singles Chart, but did better in several other countries, reaching number 33 in Germany, number 32 in New Zealand, number 25 in France and number 9 in Italy. In North America, it entered the Top 40 in both the United States (at number 31) and Canada (at number 30). It peaked at number 1 on the US Dance Club Songs chart.

The single was re-released in the UK in 1985, but only peaked at 93. In 1990, however, "It's My Life" was reissued again to promote the compilation album Natural History: The Very Best of Talk Talk. This time, the song was a hit in the UK, reaching number 13, the band's highest chart-placing single in its native country.

Music video
There are two versions of the video for "It's My Life". The first, envisioned by director Tim Pope as a statement against the banality of lip-synching, consists almost entirely of footage from the 1979 BBC wildlife documentary Life on Earth, interspersed with shots of Talk Talk lead singer Mark Hollis standing in various places throughout the London Zoo. He keeps his hands in his coat pockets and his mouth pointedly shut tight, the latter often obscured by hand-drawn animated lines that occasionally appear in the documentary footage sequences as well.

The second version, recorded at the behest of EMI, consisted of the entirety of the original video projected on a green screen behind Hollis on guitar and vocals as well as his two bandmates as they lip-synched and mimed the song, deliberately poorly and with comic exaggerated gestures.

In media
The song is played during a dinner scene of the 2005 Nick Love film The Business.

Track listings

1984 release
7" single
 "It's My Life" – 3:51
 "Does Caroline Know?" – 4:36

12" single – North America
 "It's My Life" (Extended Version) – 6:14
 "It's My Life" – 3:51
 "Again, a Game...Again" – 4:09

12" single – Europe
 "It's My Life" (12" Remix) – 6:16
 "Does Caroline Know?" – 4:33
 "It's My Life" – 3:51

1990 reissue
7" single
 "It's My Life" – 3:51
 "Renée" (Live from Hammersmith Odeon) – 7:28

CD maxi
 "It's My Life" – 3:51
 "Renée" (Live from Hammersmith Odeon) – 7:28
 "It's My Life" (Live from Hammersmith Odeon) – 7:58

Charts

Certifications

Gigabyte version

In 1995, Swedish dance music group Gigabyte covered the song, releasing it as a double release with their own song "Gave My Heart Away".

Track listings
CD-maxi	
 It's My Life (Radio Mix) - 4:17	
 It's My Life (Extended Club Mix) - 5:50	
 Gave My Heart Away (Radio Mix) - 4:41	
 Gave My Heart Away (Exteneded Mix) - 6:06

No Doubt version

The American rock band No Doubt recorded a cover version of the song to promote their first greatest hits album The Singles 1992–2003 (2003). Because the band was on hiatus while lead singer Gwen Stefani recorded her solo debut album, they decided to record a cover to avoid having to write a new song. Eventually, after the band listened to hundreds of songs from the 1980s, they narrowed it down to two contenders – "It's My Life" by Talk Talk and "Don't Change" by Australian rock band INXS. "A Question of Lust" by English electronic band Depeche Mode was another close contender. No Doubt were dubious about recording a cover and contemplated writing new material. However, they decided on "It's My Life" after rehearsing the song with producer Nellee Hooper, referring to it as a "feel-good" song. No Doubt's version of "It's My Life" was nominated for Best Pop Performance by a Duo or Group with Vocal at the 47th Grammy Awards. Jacques Lu Cont, the song's programmer, created the Thin White Duke mix of "It's My Life", which won the award for Best Remixed Recording, Non-Classical.

Commercial performance
No Doubt's cover version was successful in the United States, reaching number 10 on the Billboard Hot 100, and remaining on the chart for 28 weeks. On the Radio & Records CHR/Pop Airplay chart the song debuted at number 41 on the 10 October 2003 issue and after six weeks reached and peaked at number five staying there for two non-consecutive weeks, it remained on the top-ten of the chart for nine weeks and remained on it for 20 weeks. It was moderately successful on adult contemporary stations, reaching number 20 on the US Adult Contemporary chart, but had high longevity and appeared atop the Adult Top 40's recurrent chart. The single was more successful at nightclubs, peaking at number 16 on the US Dance Club Songs chart, and had some play on modern rock stations, reaching number 32 on the US Alternative Songs chart. The Recording Industry Association of America certified the digital download Gold for selling 500,000 copies.

On the UK Singles chart, "It's My Life" debuted at number 20 but was unable to reach a higher position until it was released with a remix of the No Doubt song "Bathwater" which boosted the single up to number 17. The single dropped off the chart after seven weeks. It was more of a success across Europe, reaching the top-ten in Italy, Finland, Germany, Ireland, the Netherlands, Norway and Sweden, and the top 20 in Austria, Belgium, France and Switzerland. The single reached number seven on the ARIA Charts in Australia, lasting 17 weeks on the chart, and was listed at number 81 on the 2004 year-end chart. The Australian Recording Industry Association certified the single Platinum in 2004 for shipping 70,000 copies.

Music video

The 1930s-style music video for the song was directed by David LaChapelle. In the video, Stefani portrays a black widow whose look closely resembles that of actress Jean Harlow, whom Stefani portrayed in the Martin Scorsese film The Aviator. She is put on trial and sentenced to death for the murders of three men she knew, who are portrayed by the other members of the band. She kills the first man (guitarist Tom Dumont) with rat poison mixed into his dinner, the second (bassist Tony Kanal) by running him over with his car, and the third (drummer Adrian Young) by throwing her hair dryer into the bathtub to electrocute him. These scenes are intercut with moments of Stefani in court and being dragged to the gas chamber, wearing a prison uniform, where she is executed. The video ends with the three murder victims together, presumably in the afterlife, laughing at her televised execution.

The music video was moderately successful on video chart programs. On MTV's Total Request Live, it reached number seven in November 2003 and was on the countdown as late as January 2004. The video peaked at number eight on MuchMusic's Countdown and remained on the program through March 2004. At the 2004 MTV Video Music Awards, "It's My Life" won the awards for Best Group Video and Best Pop Video. It also received nominations for Best Direction, Best Cinematography, and Best Art Direction.

Track listing and formats
2-track
 "It's My Life" – 3:46
 "Rock Steady" (live) – 5:53

CD single
 "It's My Life" – 3:46
 "Sunday Morning" (2002 live) – 4:49
 "Rock Steady" (2002 live) – 5:53
 "Bathwater" (2002 live) – 4:01

UK CD single
 "It's My Life" – 3:46
 "Rock Steady" (2002 live) – 5:53
 "Bathwater" (2002 live) – 4:01

UK re-issue "It's My Life" / "Bathwater" double A-side CD single
 "It's My Life" – 3:46
 "Bathwater" (Invincible Overlord Remix) – 3:07
 "It's My Life" (Jacques Lu Cont's Thin White Duke Mix) – 6:59
 "It's My Life" (Chocolate O'Brian Remix) – 5:43
 "Bathwater" (Invincible Overlord Remix Video)
 "It's My Life" (Video)

Charts

Weekly charts

Year-end charts

Certifications

Release history

References

1984 singles
1984 songs
1985 singles
1990 singles
1995 singles
2003 singles
2004 singles
Talk Talk songs
EMI Records singles
Grammy Award for Best Remixed Recording, Non-Classical
Infinity Records singles
Interscope Records singles
Music videos directed by David LaChapelle
Music videos directed by Tim Pope
No Doubt songs
Number-one singles in the Czech Republic
Parlophone singles
Protest songs
Songs written by Mark Hollis (musician)
Songs written by Tim Friese-Greene
Song recordings produced by Tim Friese-Greene